Tan-Che-Qua (alternatively Tan Chitqua or Tan Chetqua) (c. 1728 – 1796) was a Chinese artist who visited England from 1769 to 1772. He exhibited his work at the Royal Academy in 1770, and his clay models became fashionable in London for a short period. He returned to China in 1772. After the merchant Loum Kiqua in 1756-7, and the Christian convert Michael Shen Fuzong in 1687, Tan-Che-Qua is one of the earliest Chinese people known to have visited England.

Career
Tan-Che-Qua was probably born in Guangdong in China, around 1728.  He became an artist and clay modeller in Canton, making clay portrait figures.

In his middle years, Tan-Che-Qua arrived in London from Canton on 11 August 1769 on the East Indiaman Horsendon. The Chinese authorities had given him permission to travel to Batavia (now Jakarta), but he went to England instead. He lived in lodgings on the Strand, where he worked as a clay modeler, creating busts for 10 guineas and small statuettes for 15 guineas. One of the few known surviving examples of his work is a figurine of physician Anthony Askew, held by the Royal College of Physicians. The Museum of London has another attributed to Tan-Che-Qua of the London merchant Thomas Todd; the Rijksmuseum in Amsterdam has one of Dutch merchant Andreas Everardus van Braam Houckgeest; and one of David Garrick is in a private collection, which is confirmed not out of his hand but another Chinese modeler working in Canton in the 1730s.

He attended an audience with George III and Queen Charlotte. He also attended meetings at the Royal Academy of Arts and exhibited work there in 1770. He was included in a group portrait of the Royal Academicians by Johann Zoffany. A portrait of Tan-Che-Qua, thought to be the one exhibited by John Hamilton Mortimer at the annual exhibition of the Incorporated Society of Artists in 1771, is held by the Hunterian Museum at the Royal College of Surgeons in London. The portrait was misidentified as Wang-y-tong, another Chinese visitor to London in the 1770s, who attended meetings of the Royal Society. He was also sketched by Charles Grignion the Younger.

He boarded the East Indiaman Grenville in March 1771 intending to return to China. After a series of accidents the crew took against him, he disembarked at Deal, Kent. He returned to China in 1772. The Gentleman's Magazine reported that he committed suicide in Canton in the mid-1790s. According to the RKD he died in Guangzhou in 1796.

Legacy
Sir William Chambers used his name – Tan Chet-qua – for the narrator of his Explanatory Discourse by Tan Chet-qua, of Quang-Chew-fu, Gent., an appendix to the second edition (1773) of his book on Chinese gardening, Dissertation on Oriental Gardening (1772), a fanciful elaboration of contemporary English ideas about the naturalistic style of gardening in China.

References

1720s births
1796 deaths

Year of birth uncertain
Chinese sculptors
Qing dynasty people